Basic Battle Skills is a field training manual formerly issued to individual soldiers in the British Army.

Editions were modified over a period of approximately 25 years before the book was withdrawn from issue.

Format
The manual was divided into seven chapters, each one an illustrated set of instructions on how to carry out the most basic subjects taught to soldiers during their first weeks of training. 

Individual Fieldcraft and Minor Tactics
Map Reading
Basic First aid
Health and Hygiene
NBC Defence (NBC=Nuclear, Biological and Chemical [warfare])
administration and morale
Physical Fitness

The opening chapter Individual Fieldcraft and Minor Tactics starts with the information: A sound knowledge of Fieldcraft and Minor Tactics will help you in combat to:

Fight
Live
Protect yourself and your equipment
Remain fit
Be an asset to your commander

In the first chapter the manual describes in more detail the skills needed in Fieldcraft and Minor Tactics.  Commencing with "Judging Distance" and describing methods on how to ascertain how far a subject is from the soldier up to ranges of 400 metres and recommending that weapon sights be carefully adjusted for accuracy.  The chapter also gives guidance on "Personal Camouflage",  "Target Recognition", "Fire Control Orders", "Movement in the field", "Movement at night", "Night Noises", "Night vision", "Sentry duties", "Sentries at night in the field", "Rifle section formations", "Field signals (on foot)", "Advancing towards the enemy", "Weapon handling", "Ammunition" and "Trenches".

Illustrations

The book contains simple illustrations with vivid colours detailing in pictures what the wording of each section instructs a soldier to do in various situations.  For example: in chapter one instructions are provided on the method and wording to be used when challenging movement of persons approaching the sentry position.  The manual instructs the sentry to call out, "Halt, who goes there?  Advance one and be recognised."  When approached in response to this command the sentry is instructed to use the "challenge" part of the password and to expect the correct reply before allowing any further movement of the person(s) approaching his position.  The password will have previously been set by the officers in command and have been made known to every soldier within the formation.  It will take the form of two simple words, for example: the challenge part could be "sausages" and the reply "chips".  Therefore, the sentry calls out "sausages" and expects the reply "chips".  If the correct reply is not received the sentry would be expected to open fire on the enemy approaching as anyone without the password is to be treated as an enemy.

The illustration to the right shows in words and pictures how a sentry should perform his duties in the event of requiring to challenge a person or persons who approach him.

Other British Military instructional manuals
The British Army publishes many booklets and manuals to assist soldiers in remembering the lessons of training.  These have included:

Staff Duties in the Field - provides a guide for officers and soldiers in operational "staff work" for staff and regimental officers. A concise pocket version is also supplied for use in the field.
Bayonet Battle Training 
Dress Regulations for the Army
Booby Traps
Shoot to Kill

See also

 Survive To Fight
 All-In Fighting
 British Army
 Selection and Training in the British Army
 History of the British Army

References

Official military publications
Nuclear warfare
Biological warfare
Chemical warfare
British Army training
1976 non-fiction books